"Beautiful Thieves" is a song by American rock band AFI. It was released as a single from their eighth studio album Crash Love and was released to radio on December 1, 2009. It peaked at #23 on the Alternative Songs chart and #48 on the Rock Songs chart.

Music video
The music video for "Beautiful Thieves" was directed by Travis Kopach and it premiered on February 4, 2010. The video was filmed on December 16, 2009 at a mansion in Simi Valley, California. It features scenes of the band performing, as well as a storyline that "shows people being forced to be responsible for their actions; we implement that retribution, if you will," according to Havok.

Charts

References

AFI (band) songs
2009 songs
Interscope Records singles
Songs written by Hunter Burgan
Songs written by Adam Carson
Songs written by Davey Havok
Songs written by Jade Puget
2009 singles